The 1932–33 British Ice Hockey season consisted of English League and a Scottish League.

English League
The league in England was won by Oxford University.

Scottish League
Bridge of Weir won the championship and received the Canada Cup.

Scores

Table

Mitchell Trophy

Results

President's Pucks
The 1932-33 President's Pucks was the first edition of the single-elimination tournament contested in Scotland]. The title was shared by Kelvingrove and the Glasgow Mohawks.

Results

References 

British